Benjamin Leonard Hutton (born 29 January 1977), is an English former first-class cricketer.

Early life
Ben Hutton was educated at Radley (1990–95) and Durham University (1996-99) for whom he opened the innings with the former England captain Andrew Strauss.

He came from cricketing stock as the elder son of the cricketer Richard Hutton and his grandfathers Sir Leonard Hutton and Ben Brocklehurst also played first-class cricket.

Career
He represented Middlesex as a left-handed opening batsman, an enthusiastic fielder and occasional right-arm fast-medium bowler. He made his first-class debut in 1999 and was awarded his county cap in 2003. He captained the County between 2005 and 2006. In 108 first-class matches for the county, he scored 5,712 runs (average 33.60) with a highest score of 152 with 18 hundreds and 18 fifties and taking 136 catches. He announced his retirement from first-class cricket in October 2007 at the early age of 30.

Retirement
He commenced a new career in the City and also completed the term of Don Bennett as a member of the Middlesex County Cricket Club Executive Board (2011–2012).

He joined Berenberg Bank in November 2007.

References

External links
 
 Hutton announces his retirement from first-class cricket

1977 births
Living people
English cricketers
Middlesex cricket captains
Alumni of Durham University
People educated at Radley College
Cricketers from Johannesburg
British Universities cricketers
Middlesex cricketers
English cricketers of 1969 to 2000
English cricketers of the 21st century